Justice Goss may refer to:

Charles A. Goss, associate justice of the Nebraska Supreme Court
Evan B. Goss, associate justice of the North Dakota Supreme Court